Walter Owen Hickson (1863 – 8 October 1915) was an architect and surveyor based in Nottingham.

History
He was born in 1863 in Bottesford, Leicestershire, the son of William Hickson of Easthorpe Manor, Bottesford and Mary Ann Owen. He trained as a surveyor and architect in Nottingham and much of his output was dwelling houses, warehouses and hotels. He was employed by Sydney Pierrepont, 3rd Earl Manvers in the 1890s to erect estate buildings in Thoresby Park.

In 1899 he was appointed a director of the Aspley Engineering Company.

In 1903 his office was at 13 Victoria Street in Nottingham.

He died on 8 October 1915 at St Andrew's Hospital in Northampton and left an estate valued at £5,646 4s 7d.

Works
Shops and houses. 33-37 Chilwell Road, Beeston 1887
Ten Cottages. 112-130 Chilwell Road, Beeston 1887
Thorseby Estate Almshouses, Perlethorpe, Nottinghamshire 1894
Bentinck Hotel, Carrington Street, Nottingham 1904-05
10 houses on Trafalgar Road, Beeston 1905-06

References

19th-century English architects
20th-century English architects
Architects from Nottingham
People from Bottesford, Leicestershire
1863 births
1915 deaths